Chris Wimmer (born June 23, 1979) is an American professional stock car racing driver. He has raced mostly in short track competition and as high as the NASCAR Busch Series (now Xfinity Series). Wimmer competed in the ASA Midwest Tour (now ARCA Midwest Tour) where he finished as high as second in his final season (2013). He has run a more limited schedule of touring events since.

Early career
Wimmer's career began in his youth, when he began working on his uncle, Larry Detjens' race car. Detjens was a champion late model racer who competed at Slinger Super Speedway and Wisconsin International Raceway. Detjens had the Slinger Nationals race trophy named after him after his death in 1981. Wimmer would work on his brother Scott Wimmer's cars after Scott started racing at age 14.

He began his racing career at age 17 while still in high school, racing pure stocks. He won the pure stocks track championship at State Park Speedway near Wausau in 1997. Later, he moved over to late models, and he won State Park Speedway's Larry Detjens Memorial Race in 2001. Participating in 149 races, Chris won 17 times and had 53 top five finishes. In 2001, he moved up to the American Speed Association (ASA), competing in more than 50 events over the next three years.

NASCAR career
On January 9, 2004, Wimmer signed to drive for MB Motorsports in the Craftsman Truck Series. Piloting the #63 Dave Porter Truck Sales Ford, Wimmer debuted at Mansfield Motorsports Speedway in early April. In the season he competed in twelve races; his best finish was 18th at Kansas Speedway. The following season, he was left without a ride before coming to an agreement with Green Light Racing in June 2005. He raced the #07 Chevrolet at the Milwaukee Mile. He would go on to race five more events for the team, occasionally switching to the #08 Chevy (which was unsponsored) and back to the #07, which had different sponsors in all four races Wimmer drove it. His best finish was 17th.

Despite having only run in 17 Craftsman Truck races, he came to a three-year agreement with Keith Coleman Racing in early November 2005 to drive the #23 Chevrolet Monte Carlo in the Busch Series. He raced once in the 2005 season at Phoenix International Raceway and finished 37th after crashing. In 2006, Wimmer tried to compete for Busch Series Rookie of the Year, but after missing many races, he was released. He returned to the Truck Series to drive the #08 truck for Green Light at Milwaukee, but finished last after an electrical failure. Later in the season, he made one race at Dover International Speedway, finishing 43rd in the #79 Speedco Chevy. His final race of the year came at Texas Motor Speedway, when he drove the #76 Automotive Fabrication Chevy for Jeff Milburn to a 34th-place finish.

In 2007, he drove one more race for Milburn at Texas, where he finished 30th after an engine failure.

Post-NASCAR career

In 2008, he began competing on the ASA Midwest Tour, finishing fourth in the season points. He had nine Top 10 finishes and was the fastest qualifier in two of 14 events. He was the only driver in the Top 5 in points to have no wins.

Wimmer operated State Park Speedway along with his father. He raced on the ASA series, continuing after it was renamed as the ARCA Midwest Tour,8 until finishing second in series points in 2013. He has also raced in events at State Park Speedway and other area tracks such as Marshfield Motor Speedway and Golden Sands Speedway. Wimmer competed in the 2014 Slinger Nationals. He raced up to second behind Dennis Prunty and took the lead late in the race when Prunty's car stopped running. Wimmer held off a late charge by Matt Kenseth to take the win. He won the final race in a three-race super late model Challenge Series at Madison International Speedway to take the track championship.

In May 2015, Wimmer took over as crew chief for Harrison Burton's Super Late Model replacing Freddie Query.  Burton is the 14-year-old son of Jeff Burton.

Motorsports career results

NASCAR
(key) (Bold – Pole position awarded by qualifying time. Italics – Pole position earned by points standings or practice time. * – Most laps led.)

Busch Series

Craftsman Truck Series

ARCA Re/Max Series
(key) (Bold – Pole position awarded by qualifying time. Italics – Pole position earned by points standings or practice time. * – Most laps led.)

References

External links

 
 Wimmer Racing official website
 

Living people
1979 births
Sportspeople from Wausau, Wisconsin
Racing drivers from Wisconsin
NASCAR drivers
American Speed Association drivers
ARCA Midwest Tour drivers
ARCA Menards Series drivers